Emmaus Catholic College is an independent Roman Catholic co-educational secondary day school, located in Kemps Creek, Sydney, New South Wales, Australia.

The College was established in 1988 and caters for students from Years 7–12. The College is under the direction of the Catholic Education, Parramatta Diocese.

Overview

From 2009 the school has undergone renovations. These included school facilities, a refurbishment of its chapel and a new oval.

The Emmaus Catholic College principal is Robert Nastasi, who was appointed as principal in Term 4 of the 2016 academic year.

See also

 List of Catholic schools in New South Wales
 Catholic education in Australia
 Catholic Education in the Diocese of Parramatta

References

External links
Emmaus Catholic College website
Holy spirit parish website

Educational institutions established in 1988
Catholic secondary schools in Sydney
Roman Catholic Diocese of Parramatta
1988 establishments in Australia
St Marys, New South Wales